Lilaea (minor planet designation: 213 Lilaea) is a large main belt asteroid. It was discovered by German-American astronomer C. H. F. Peters on February 16, 1880, in Clinton, New York and was named after Lilaea, a Naiad in Greek mythology.

Photometric observations of this asteroid in 1986 gave a light curve with a period of 8.045 ± 0.008 hours and a brightness variation of 0.20 ± 0.01 in magnitude. The curve is asymmetrical with two distinct minima. This object has a spectrum that matches an F-type asteroid classification. As with C-type asteroids, its composition is primitive and rich in carbon.

References

External links 
 The Asteroid Orbital Elements Database
 Minor Planet Discovery Circumstances
 Asteroid Lightcurve Data File
 
 

Background asteroids
Lilaea
Lilaea
F-type asteroids (Tholen)
B-type asteroids (SMASS)
18800216